Liesbet Van Breedam-Simurina (born 27 January 1979) is a beach volleyball player from Belgium. She is partnered in the 2008 Summer Olympics with Liesbeth Mouha.

External links
Profile at the Beach Volleyball Database

1979 births
Living people
Beach volleyball players at the 2008 Summer Olympics
Belgian beach volleyball players
Olympic beach volleyball players of Belgium
People from Willebroek
Women's beach volleyball players
Sportspeople from Antwerp Province